Highland Hospital may refer to:

In the United States:
Highland Hospital (Oakland, California)
Highland Hospital (Rochester, New York)
Highland Hospital (Asheville, North Carolina)

Trauma centers